Ioesse putaoensis is a species of beetle in the family Cerambycidae. It was described by Ohbayashi and Lin in 2012. It is known from Myanmar.

References

Petrognathini
Beetles described in 2012